Michele Fornasier (born 22 August 1993) is an Italian footballer who plays as a centre-back for  club Monopoli.

Club career

Early career

Born in Vittorio Veneto, Fornasier joined Fiorentina in 2007, but moved to England two years later, signing with Manchester United. Shortly after, Fiorentina filed a formal complaint to FIFA about the transfer. However, no action was taken by FIFA after Fiorentina failed to supply evidences for the case.

Manchester United
When playing for United, Fornasier lifted up the 2010–11 FA Youth Cup and appeared with the Under-21 squad; he also appeared in the Dallas Cup twice (2012 and 2013) He left the club in June 2013 after making no first-team appearances.

Sampdoria
On 2 July 2013, Fornasier signed with U.C. Sampdoria. He made his professional debut on 5 December, starting in a 4–1 home win over Verona.

On 9 February 2014, Fornasier made his Serie A debut, starting in a 1–0 win over Cagliari. Fornasier ended the season with 10 appearances.

Pescara
On 23 January 2015, Fornasier was signed by Pescara in a temporary deal with an option to purchase. On 27 June, the Dolphins excised the option, with Lucas Torreira moved to Sampdoria effectively on 1 July 2016.

Venezia (loan)
On 22 January 2019, Fornasier signed to Venezia on loan with an option to buy.

Parma

Trapani (loan)
On 16 August 2019, Fornasier signed to Serie A club Parma and after he joined Serie B club Trapani on loan until 30 June 2020.

Cremonese
On 3 October 2020, he moved to Serie B club Cremonese. He only made one league appearance for Cremonese in the 2020–21 season as he was fighting injuries. His contract with Cremonese was terminated by mutual consent on 30 August 2021.

Monopoli
On 21 September 2021, he signed a three-year contract with Serie C club Monopoli.

International career
Fornasier was a youth international for Italy.

References

External links

FIGC National Team Data 

1993 births
Living people
People from Vittorio Veneto
Sportspeople from the Province of Treviso
Footballers from Veneto
Italian footballers
Association football defenders
Serie A players
Serie B players
Serie C players
ACF Fiorentina players
U.C. Sampdoria players
Delfino Pescara 1936 players
Venezia F.C. players
Parma Calcio 1913 players
Trapani Calcio players
U.S. Cremonese players
S.S. Monopoli 1966 players
Manchester United F.C. players
Italian expatriate footballers
Italian expatriate sportspeople in England
Expatriate footballers in England
Italy youth international footballers